Saba Ali Khan Pataudi is an Indian jewelry designer and mutawalli (Chief Trustee) of the Auqaf-e-Shahi (Royal Trust), established by the-then ‘Princely State’ of the Kingdom of Bhopal as a royal charitable endowment.

Background
Khan, a member of the Pataudi family of Pashtun (Afghan) ancestry, is the daughter of cricketer Mansoor Ali Khan Pataudi and actress Sharmila Tagore, and the sister of actors, Saif Ali Khan and Soha Ali Khan. She is the granddaughter of Sajida Begum, the Nawab Begum of Bhopal, and Iftikhar Ali Khan Pataudi, the Nawab of Pataudi. Her great-grandfather, Hamidullah Khan, succeeded the throne of Bhopal, after a long reign of royal queens. The actress Sara Ali Khan is her niece, and the actress Kareena Kapoor Khan is her sister-in-law. The titular Begum of Bhopal, Saleha Sultan, was her aunt, and through her she is the first cousin of cricketer, Saad Bin Jung. Major General of Pakistan Sher Ali Khan is her great-granduncle, and the diplomat Shahryar Khan is her uncle, through her grandaunt Abida Sultan.

Auqaf-e-Shahi 
The Auqaf-e-Shahi is a charitable trust that was endowed by the royal family of the Kingdom of the State of Bhopal. The trust manages a portfolio worth Rs 1200 crore, consisting mainly of real estate (both, religious and otherwise) in Bhopal, apart from properties in Mecca as well as Medina in Saudi Arabia. As a convention, a family member of the ruler of the state of Bhopal, or the ruler himself, was the mutawalli, the chief trustee who managed the assets of the trust for philanthropic purposes. Indian cricket captain Mansoor Ali Khan, who was the titular Nawab of Bhopal and Pataudi was the mutawalli till his death in 2011. Saba served under her father as naib mutawalli (Deputy Trustee) before taking over the reigns after his demise, while her brother Saif Ali Khan inherited the titular titles of the Nawab of Bhopal and Pataudi, and the respective estates.

Mansoor Ali Khan reportedly did not think of his son as a possible mutawalli, conscious that a film actor's appointment as head of islamic religious bodies may not go down well with certain sections.

In her tenure as the mutawalli, Auqaf-e-Shahi has acquired certain additional properties in Mecca. In 2016, she announced that the Waqf tribunal has declared that 34 acres of land around the Shahi Qabristan in Bhopal belonged to Auqaf-e-Shahi, and the same would be monetised with the proceeds going to improve the educational and health institutions of Bhopal.

References 

Jewellery designers
Living people
1976 births
Indian people of Pashtun descent